Kanyashree  is an initiative taken by the Government of West Bengal to improve the life and the status of the girls by helping economically backward families with cash so that families do not arrange the marriage of their girl child before eighteen years because of economic problem. The purpose of this initiative is to uplift those girls who are from poor families and thus can't pursue higher studies due to tough economic conditions. It has been given international recognition by the United Nations Department of International Development and the UNICEF.

The scheme has two components:
 Annual scholarship of Rs. 1000.00
 One time grant of Rs. 25,000.00
The annual scholarship is for unmarried girls aged 13–18 years enrolled in class VIII-XII in government recognized regular or equivalent open school or vocational / technical training courses.
Recently the bar of income is withdrawn by Gov. W.B. now every girl can apply for that scheme.

A Conditional Cash Transfer Scheme 
Kanyashree Prakalpa has been designed to ensure that girls stay in school and delay their marriages till at least age of 18. Kanyashree's strategy is simple, keeping girls away from marriage till exact age and keeping them in the streamline of their education, to do that government facilitates these girls with financial aid. It has changed the behavioural attitude particularly who wants to marry their girl child before 18 years of age.

The Scheme has two conditional cash benefit components. 
 The first is K1, an annual scholarship of Rs. 1000/- to be paid annually to the girls from 13 to 18 years of age group for every year that they remain in education, provided they are unmarried at the time. (Note: During the years 2013–14 and 2014-1 the annual scholarship was Rs. 500/-).
 The second benefit is K2, a one-time grant of 25,000/-, to be paid when girls turn 18, provided that they are engaged in an academic or occupations pursuit and are unmarried at the time.
The term 'education' encompasses secondary and higher secondary education, as well as the various vocational, technical and sports courses available for this age group. To ensure an equity focus, the scheme is open only to girls from families whose annual income is R. 1,20,000/- or less. For girls with special needs, girls who have lost both parents, as well as for girls currently residing in Juvenile Justice homes, this criterion is waived. Although the annual scholarship is payable only when girls reach Class VIII, this, criterion is waived for girls with special needs whose disability is 40% or more.

Even though the credit for the Kanyashree Prakalpa goes to the Government of West Bengal, India, the main project is actually a derivative of the beneficial scheme of the Government of India. However, as the Government of India did not recognise Kanyashree Prakalpa as a part of its beneficial schemes for the girls from rural and suburban areas, especially from poor families, the state government of West Bengal claimed the scheme as its own.

Award & Recognition 
 In June 2017 United Nations honours Kanyashree with the highest public service award. Kanyashree was ranked the best among 552 such social sector schemes from across 62 countries that were nominated for the coveted award.
 Finalist in GEM-Tech Awards 2016 organized by ITU and UN Women
 United Nations WSIS Prize 2016 Champion in e-Government Category (WSIS Action Line C7)
 CSI-Nihilent Award, 2014–15.
 Skoch Award and Order of Merit 2015 for Smart Governance.
 National E-governance Award 2014–2015 awarded by the Department of Administrative Reforms and Public Grievances, Government of India.
 Manthan Award for Digital Inclusion for Development (South Asia and Asia Pacific) 2014 under the category E-Women and Empowerment.
 West Bengal Chief Ministers Award for Empowerment of Girls, 2014

The Scheme was appreciated as a good practice at:
 Trafficking in Persons (TIP) Enclave organized by U. S. Consulate & Shakti Vahini (Siliguri, February 2016).
 National Workshop on "Conditional Cash Transfers for Children: Experiences of States in India" organized by NITI Aayog, India (Delhi, December 2015).
 Consultation on "Empowerment of Adolescent Girls" organized by the World Bank (Ranchi, May 2015).
 Consultation on "Child Marriage and Teenage Pregnancies" organized Tata Institute of Social Sciences (Delhi, March 2015).
 The "Girls Summit organized by DFID and UNICEF (London, July 2014)

Kanyashree Day 
14 August is celebrated as Kanyashree Day to promote the scheme throughout the state. On August 14, 2013 state wide events were held to publicize the scheme. In Kolkata the event was presided over by the Chief Minister of West Bengal, Mamata Banerjee. Awareness campaigns were organized by the government in districts.

Kanyashree University 

The state government of West Bengal is setting up Kanyashree University in Nadia district and Kanyashree colleges across the state so as to empower girls. The Kanyashree university would be only for women.Earlier in January 2019, the West Bengal Chief Minister Mamata Banerjee laid the foundation stone of new Kanyashree university at Krishnagar in Nadia district.

Year-wise statistics 
The following are Year-wise statistics:

 Total K1 Girls Since Inception: 57,28,574
 Total K2 Girls Since Inception: 23,38,620
 Total Unique Girls Since Inception: 60,02,139

Similar programmes
A similar program was instituted in Bangladesh in 1982, called the Female Secondary School Stipend Program. It was first launched in six areas of the country and later extended to other areas owing to its success.

See also 
 Didi Ke Bolo, grievance-redressal initiative taken by the Government of West Bengal

References

External links 
 

Government schemes in West Bengal
Women's education in India
Mamata Banerjee
2013 establishments in West Bengal